Strychnos pungens (English: spine-leaved monkey-orange, Afrikaans: Stekelblaarklapper) is a tree which belongs to the Loganiaceae. Usually about 5m tall, occurring in mixed woodland or in rocky places. Branches are short and rigid. Leaves are smooth, stiff, opposite, elliptic and with a sharp, spine-like tip. Occurring in South Africa on the Witwatersrand, Magaliesberg and further north to northern Namibia, northern Botswana and Zimbabwe.

The fruit is large (120mm diameter), round and with a smooth hard shell, bluish-green in colour and turning yellow when ripe. The pulp of ripe fruit is rich in citric acid and is edible, but the seeds are mildly poisonous. The tree is a close relative of Strychnos nux-vomica, the source of strychnine.

References

New Fruits for Arid Climates

pungens
Fruits originating in Africa
Trees of Africa
Desert fruits
Drought-tolerant trees